Bryan Bender (born May 18, 1972) is a former award-winning national security reporter and editor and strategic communications executive who advises clean energy, space and biotech companies, nonprofits and research universities for Strategic Marketing Innovations, a Washington, DC, government affairs firm.

He is former senior national correspondent for POLITICO, where he authored the Morning Defense newsletter and edited POLITICO Space. He previously covered the Pentagon for The Boston Globe and Jane’s Defence Weekly. Bender has covered U.S. military operations in the Middle East, Europe, Asia, and Latin America and reported on a range of topics including the wars in Afghanistan and Iraq; domestic and international terrorism; veterans affairs; military training; nuclear arms control; the anti-war movement; the nexus between climate change and national security; government secrecy; and newly declassified government files on Cuba, Vietnam, and the Kennedy Administration.

He has also chronicled the aerospace and defense industries, the international arms trade, the war in Ukraine, and U.S. government efforts to research unidentified aerial phenomena, or UFOs. He is author You Are Not Forgotten, the story of an Iraq War veteran’s search for a missing World War II fighter pilot in the jungles of New Guinea.

Personal background
Bender is a native of Wilkes-Barre, Pennsylvania. He earned undergraduate degrees in Political Science and English Writing from the University of Pittsburgh.

Professional background
Bender specializes in military affairs, foreign policy, nuclear proliferation, terrorism, and government secrecy.

In 1998, Bender was named the Washington bureau chief for Jane's Defence Weekly, a London-based magazine.

In 2007, Bender was a finalist for the Scripps Howard Foundation's Washington Reporting Award for an investigation into an Army cheating scandal.

In 2011, he was a finalist for the Gerald R. Loeb Award for Distinguished Business Reporting for a probe into the growing role of retired generals and admirals in defense companies and as private consultants.

In 2013, he was awarded the National Press Foundation's Everett Dirksen Award for Distinguished Reporting of Congress for an investigation of the growing role of think tanks in partisan politics.

He is also former president of Military Reporters and Editors Association, the professional association for journalists covering the U.S. military.

His work has also appeared in The New Republic, The New York Times, Los Angeles Times, Jane's Defence Weekly, among other publications. He is also frequent television and radio commentator on national security and foreign policy topics.

References

External links
 
 Transcript of CNN appearance
 Appearance on NPR's Morning Edition
 Article by Bender on PTSD prevention efforts in the military
 Article by Bender on nuclear proliferation
 Article by Bender on the Boston Marathon bombings
 Article by Bender on declassified Vietnam-era JFK documents
 Article by Bender on declassified Robert F. Kennedy documents

The Boston Globe people
American male journalists
Living people
1972 births
Writers from Wilkes-Barre, Pennsylvania
University of Pittsburgh alumni
Journalists from Pennsylvania